Jean Camille Walrand is a professor of Computer Science at UC Berkeley. He received his Ph.D. from the Department of Electrical Engineering and Computer Sciences department at the University of California, Berkeley, and has been on the faculty of that department since 1982. He is the author of "An Introduction to Queueing Networks" (Prentice Hall, 1988), "Communication Networks: A First Course" (2nd ed. McGraw-Hill, 1998), "Probability in Electrical Engineering and Computer Sciences: An Application-Driven Course" (Amazon, 2014), and "Uncertainty: A User Guide" (Amazon, 2019),  and co-author of "High-Performance Communication Networks" (2nd ed, Morgan Kaufmann, 2000), "Communication Networks: A Concise Introduction" (Morgan & Claypool, 2010), "Scheduling and Congestion Control for Communication and Processing networks" (Morgan & Claypool, 2010), and "Sharing Network Resources" (Morgan & Claypool, 2014). His research interests include stochastic processes, queuing theory, communication networks, game theory, and the economics of the Internet.

Walrand has received numerous awards for his work over the years. He is a Fellow of the Belgian American Education Foundation and of the IEEE. Additionally, he is a recipient of the Lanchester Prize, the Stephen O. Rice Prize., the IEEE Kobayashi Award, and the ACM SIGMETRICS Achievement award.

References

Living people
American computer scientists
UC Berkeley College of Engineering alumni
UC Berkeley College of Engineering faculty
Fellow Members of the IEEE
Year of birth missing (living people)